Permosynoidea is a superfamily of Protocoleoptera that contains two known families. The type family is Permosynidae.

References

 
Beetle superfamilies